Gaucho literature, also known as gauchesco ("gauchoesque") genre was a literary movement purporting to use the language of the gauchos, comparable to the American cowboy, and reflecting their mentality. Although earlier works have been identified as gauchoesque, the movement particularly thrived from the 1870s to 1920s in Argentina, Uruguay and southern Brazil after which the movement petered out, although some works continued to be written. Gauchoesque works continue to be read and studied as a significant part of Argentine literary history. 

The movement arose as writers in those countries developed their understanding of their national identities. Three great poets in this trend were, José Hernández, Estanislao del Campo and Hilario Ascasubi.   

The influence of folk music and a countrified language has always, to some extent, been felt in popular literature, as, for example, in the folk-flavoured poetry of the Uruguayan gauchoesque poet Bartolomé Hidalgo (1788–1822); unless otherwise noted, each year in this article links to its corresponding "[year] in literature" article). And the influx on the soul which the gaucho exercises can be felt on the work of much later writers who loved the country scene of Argentina and Uruguay, such as Ricardo Güiraldes, Benito Lynch and Enrique Amorim. This is particularly true of even the most modern Uruguayan literature.

With Mark Twain's attempt to reproduce the dialect of Missouri boys, slaves, "injuns", etc., gauchoesque literature actually aspires to use, to perpetuate what purports to be the actual language of the gauchos.

Significant works and authors of Gaucho literature

Each year links to its corresponding "[year] in literature" article, except for poetry, which links to its "[year] in poetry" article:

Poetry
 Hilario Ascasubi, Santos Vega o los Mellizos de la Flor (1851)
 Estanislao del Campo, Fausto (1866)
 Jose Hernandez, Martin Fierro (first part 1872, second part 1879)
 Rafael Obligado, Santos Vega (1885)
 Leopoldo Lugones " Romances del rio Seco" "La guerra gaucha" y otros
Delfina Benigna da Cunha

Novels
 Eduardo Gutiérrez, Juan Moreira (1880)
 William Henry Hudson, The Purple Land (1885)
 Benito Lynch:
 The Englishman of the Bones (1924)
 The Romance of a Gaucho (1930)
 Ricardo Güiraldes, Don Segundo Sombra (1926)

Other Argentine writers
In chronological order by birth year; 
 Juan Godoy (1793–1864)
 Domingo Faustino Sarmiento (1811–1888)

Other Uruguayan writers
 Bartolomé Hidalgo (1788–1822)
 Eduardo Acevedo Díaz (1851–1921)
 Javier de Viana (1868–1926)
 Justino Zavala Muniz (1898–1968)
 Serafín J. García
 Alcides de María
 Orosmán Moratorio
 Wenceslao Varela

References
 Andermann, Jens, Mapas de poder. Una arqueología literaria del espacio argentino, Rosario, Beatriz Viterbo, 2000.
 Ansaldi, Waldo, "La forja de un dictador. El caso de Juan Manuel de Rosas", en Julio Labastida Martín del Campo (coord.), Dictaduras y dictadores, México, Siglo XXI, 1986.
 Aragón, R. y J. Calvetti, Genio y figura de José Hernández, Buenos Aires, Eudeba, 1972.
 Arrieta, Rafael Alberto, “Estanislao del Campo”, en Rafael Alberto Arrieta (dir.), Historia de la literatura Argentina, III, Buenos Aires, Peuser, 1959.
 Ayestarán, Lauro, La primitiva poesía gauchesca en el Uruguay (1812–1838), Montevideo, El Siglo Ilustrado, 1950.
 Barba, Fernando E., Los autonomistas del 70, Buenos Aires, Centro Editor de América Latina, 1982.
 Borello, Rodolfo: Hidalgo, iniciador de la poesía gauchesca Madrid, 1966
 Borello, Rodolfo y otros, Trayectoria de la poesía gauchesca, Buenos Aires, Plus Ultra, 1977.
 Borello, Rodolfo, Hernández: poesía y política, Buenos Aires, Plus Ultra, 1973.
 Borges, Jorge Luis y Margarita Guerrero, El “Martín Fierro” [1953], en Jorge Luis Borges, Obras completas en colaboración, Barcelona, Emecé, cuarta edición, 1997.
 Borges, Jorge Luis, “La poesía gauchesca”, Discusión, Buenos Aires, Emecé, 1952.
 Caillava, Domingo A., Historia de la literatura gauchesca en el Uruguay. 1810-1940, Montevideo, Claudio García & Cia., 1945.
 Caillet-Bois, Julio, “Hilario Ascasubi”, en Rafael Alberto Arrieta (dir.), Historia de la literatura Argentina, III, Buenos Aires, Peuser, 1959.
 Chávez, Fermín, José Hernández. Periodista, político y poeta, Buenos Aires, Plus Ultra, 1973.
 Eujanián, Alejandro, “La cultura: público, autores y editores”, en Marta Bonaudo (dir.), Nueva Historia Argentina, IV, Liberalismo, estado y orden burgués (1852–1880), Buenos Aires, Sudamericana, 1999.
 Galván Moreno, Celestino, El periodismo argentino, Buenos Aires, Claridad, 1944.
 Goldman, Noemí (directora), Revolución, república, confederación, 1806-1852 (Nueva historia Argentina, vol. 3), Buenos Aires, Sudamericana, 1999.
 Goldman, Noemí y Ricardo Salvatore (compiladores), Caudillismos rioplatenses. Nuevas miradas a un viejo problema, Buenos Aires, Eudeba, 1998.
 Gramuglio, María T. y Beatriz Sarlo (selección, prólogo y notas), Martín Fierro y su crítica, Buenos Aires, Centro Editor de América Latina,1980.
 Gramuglio, María T. y Beatriz Sarlo, “José Hernández” y "Martín Fierro", en Historia de la literatura Argentina, 2. Del romanticismo al naturalismo, Buenos Aires, Centro Editor de América Latina, 1980-1986.
 Gramuglio, María T., “Continuidad entre la Ida y la Vuelta de `Martín Fierro´”, en Punto de Vista, II, 7, noviembre de 1979.
 Gramuglio, María Teresa y Beatriz Sarlo, “José Hernández”, en Susana Zanetti, (directora), Historia de la literatura Argentina, 2, Del romanticismo al naturalismo, Buenos Aires, Centro Editor de América Latina, 1980-1986.
 Halperín Donghi, Tulio, Revolución y guerra, México, Siglo XXI, 1979.
 Halperín Donghi, Tulio, Una nación para el desierto argentino, Buenos Aires, Centro Editor de América Latina, 1982.
 Jitrik, Noé, “El tema del canto en el Martín Fierro, de José Hernández”, El fuego de la especie, Buenos Aires, Siglo XXI, 1971.
 Jitrik, Noé, José Hernández, Buenos Aires, Centro Editor de América Latina, 1971.
 Lois, Élida, “Estudio filológico preliminar”, en José Hernández, Martín Fierro, Edición crítica, Coordinadores Élida Lois y Ángel Núñez, París-Madrid, Archivos, 2001.
 Ludmer, Josefina, El género gauchesco. Un tratado sobre la patria, Buenos Aires, Sudamericana, 1988.
 Lugones, Leopoldo, El payador y antología de poesía y prosa, Prólogo Jorge Luis Borges, Selección, notas y cronología Guillermo Ara, Caracas, Biblioteca Ayacucho, 1979.
 Martínez Estrada, Ezequiel, Muerte y transfiguración de Martín Fierro, México, Fondo de Cultura Económica, 1948.
 Mujica Lainez, Manuel, Vidas del Gallo y el Pollo, Buenos Aires, Centro Editor de América Latina, 1966.
 Myers, Jorge, Orden y virtud. El discurso republicano en el régimen rosista, Bernal, Universidad Nacional de Quilmes, 1995.
 Pagés Larraya, Antonio, Prosas del Martín Fierro. Buenos Aires, Raigal, 1952.
 Pivel Devoto, Juan E. y Alcira Ranieri de Pivel Devoto, Historia de la República Oriental del Uruguay (1830–1930), Montevideo, Raúl Artagave y Cia., 1945.
 Prieto, Adolfo, “La culminación de la poesía gauchesca”, en Rodolfo Borello y otros, Trayectoria..., 1997 (op. cit.).
 Prieto, Adolfo, El discurso criollista en la formación de la Argentina moderna, Buenos Aires, Sudamericana, 1988.
 Rama, Ángel, "El sistema literario de la poesía gauchesca", prólogo a Poesía gauchesca, Caracas, Biblioteca Ayacucho, 1977.
 Rama, Ángel, Los gauchipolíticos rioplatenses, Buenos Aires, Centro Editor de América Latina, 1982.
 Ramos, Julio, Desencuentros de la modernidad en América Latina. Literatura y política en el siglo XIX, México, Fondo de Cultura Económica, 1989.
 Rivera, Jorge B., "La paga del gauchesco", en Clarín, Buenos Aires, 18 de mayo de 1989.
 Rivera, Jorge B., “Ingreso, difusión e instalación modelar del Martín Fierro en el contexto de la cultura argentina”, en José Hernández, Martín Fierro, Edición crítica (Ángel Núñez y Élida Lois, coordinadores), Paris-Madrid, Colección Archivos, 51, 2001.
 Rodríguez Molas, Ricardo, Historia social del gaucho, Buenos Aires, Centro Editor de América Latina, 1982.
 Rodríguez Molas, Ricardo, Luis Pérez y la biografía de Rosas escrita en verso en 1830, Buenos Aires, Clío, 1957.
 Rojas, Ricardo, Historia de la literatura Argentina. Ensayo filosófico sobre la evolución de la cultura en el Plata [1917-1922], I y II, Los gauchescos, Buenos Aires, Kraft, 1960.
 Roman, Claudia (Selección, presentación y notas), El terror de las musas. Lectores contemporáneos del Fausto criollo (1866–1870), Buenos Aires, 2002.
 Romano, Eduardo, “Poesía tradicional, poesía popular, poesía cultivada”, Sobre poesía popular Argentina, Buenos Aires, Centro Editor de América Latina, 1983.
 Sábato, Hilda, “La vida pública en Buenos Aires”, en Marta Bonaudo (dir.), Liberalismo, estado y orden burgués (1852–1880), Nueva historia Argentina, IV, Buenos Aires, Sudamericana, 1999.
 Salvatore, Ricardo D., “El imperio de la ley. Delito, estado y sociedad en la era rosista”, en Delito y Sociedad. Revista de Ciencias Sociales, 4-5, 1994.
 Salvatore, Ricardo D., “Reclutamiento militar, disciplinamiento y proletarización en la era de Rosas”, en Boletín del Instituto de Historia Argentina y Americana “Dr. E. Ravignani”, Tercera Serie, 5, primer semestre de 1992.
 Sansone, Eneida, “La poesía gauchesca, de Hidalgo al Viejo Pancho”, en Capítulo oriental. Historia de la literatura uruguaya, Montevideo, Centro Editor de América Latina, 1968.
 Scobie, James R., La lucha por la consolidación de la nacionalidad Argentina. 1852-1862, Buenos Aires, Hachette, 1964.
 Schvartzman, Julio, “El gaucho letrado”, Microcrítica, Buenos Aires, Biblos, 1986.
  Sosa de Newton, Lily, Genio y figura de Hilario Ascasubi, Buenos Aires, Eudeba, 1981.
 Vidart, Daniel y otros, El gaucho y la literatura gauchesca, Cuadernos de Marcha, 6, Montevideo, octubre de 1967.
 Villanueva, Amaro, Crítica y pico. El sentido essential del Martín Fierro, Buenos Aires, Plus Ultra, 1972.
 Weinberg, Félix, “La poesía gauchesca de Hidalgo a Ascasubi”, en Rodolfo Borello y otros, Trayectoria..., 1997 (op. cit.).
 Zorraquín Becú, Horacio, Tiempo y vida de José Hernández (1834–1886), Buenos Aires, Emecé, 1972.

Notes

Argentine literature
Uruguayan literature
Brazilian literature
Literary genres
Gaucho culture